Moloch: Book of Angels Volume 6 is an album by Uri Caine performing compositions from John Zorn's second Masada book, "The Book of Angels".

Reception 
The Allmusic review by Thom Jurek awarded the album 4 stars

Track listing 
All compositions by John Zorn.
 Rimmon - 4:45
 Domiel - 3:56 - misspelled as "Lomiel" on album sleeve 
 Mehriel - 4:32 - misspelled as "Kebriel" on album sleeve 
 Savliel - 2:25
 Tufrial - 4:04
 Jerazol - 3:41
 Harshiel - 3:34
 Dumah - 3:14 - misspelled as "Lumah" on album sleeve 
 Harviel - 5:01
 Segef - 1:59
 Sahriel - 4:59
 Shokad - 2:56
 Zophiel - 5:01
 Hayyoth - 2:31
 Nuriel - 5:51
 Ubaviel - 5:17
 Hadrial - 4:41
 Cassiel - 2:37
 Rimmon - 6:14
Recorded at Avatar Studios in New York City on September 6, 2006

Personnel 
 Uri Caine – piano

References 

2006 albums
Albums produced by John Zorn
Book of Angels albums
Solo piano jazz albums
Tzadik Records albums
Uri Caine albums